Elections were held in Middlesex County, Ontario on October 25, 2010 in conjunction with municipal elections across the province.

Middlesex County Council
County Council consists of the mayors of each municipality plus the deputy mayors of the municipalities over 5,000 people.

Adelaide-Metcalfe

Lucan Biddulph

Middlesex Centre

North Middlesex

Southwest Middlesex

Strathroy-Caradoc

Thames Centre

Newbury

2010 Ontario municipal elections
Middlesex County, Ontario